Chichen Itza International Airport  is an international airport located in Chichen Itza, Yucatán, Mexico, in the northern Yucatán Peninsula. Airport construction began in 1999 and it was inaugurated on April 12, 2000 with an investment of 135 million pesos (about US$14,250,000 in that year). Initially, Aeroméxico, Mexicana, Aerocozumel and American Airlines were interested in making operations at the airport, shortly after the airlines stopped operating because it was not profitable, the tourists arrived first to Cancún and after they went to Chichén Itzá in car or bus. Currently the airport is almost inoperative and has left a debt of 27 million pesos (about US$1,450,000).

See also

List of the busiest airports in Mexico

References

External links
SkyVector Airport Info Page

Airports in Yucatán
Chichen Itza